Ke'Shawn LaMont Vaughn (born May 4, 1997) is an American football running back for the Tampa Bay Buccaneers of the National Football League (NFL). He played college football at Illinois and Vanderbilt.

Early years
Vaughn attended Pearl-Cohn Comprehensive High School in Nashville, Tennessee. As a senior, he rushed for 2,646 yards and 45 touchdowns and was named the Tennessee Gatorade Football Player of the Year. Vaughn was also a high school track and field standout, anchoring the state champion 4 x 100m relay his senior year. A 4-star running back recruit, Vaughn committed to the University of Illinois to play college football over offers from Louisville, Notre Dame, Purdue, and West Virginia, among others.

College career
As a true freshman at Illinois in 2015, Vaughn rushed for 723 yards on 157 carries with six touchdowns. As a sophomore in 2016, he had 301 rushing yards on 60 carries and three touchdowns. After the season, Vaughn transferred to Vanderbilt University. After redshirting his first year at Vanderbilt in 2017 due to transfer rules, he rushed for 1,244 yards on 157 carries and 12 touchdowns in 2018. Vaughn returned to Vanderbilt for his senior season in 2019 rather than declare for the 2019 NFL Draft.

Professional career 

Vaughn was drafted by the Tampa Bay Buccaneers in the third round, 76th overall, of the 2020 NFL Draft. He was placed on the reserve/COVID-19 list on July 27, 2020. He was activated on August 9, 2020. Vaughn scored his first professional touchdown on a nine-yard reception from Tom Brady in a Week 4 victory over the Los Angeles Chargers. Overall, Vaughn finished his rookie season with 26 carries for 109 rushing yards in ten games. Vaughn earned a Super Bowl ring when the Buccaneers defeated the Kansas City Chiefs 31–9 in Super Bowl LV.

On December 26, 2021, in a game against the Carolina Panthers, Vaughn scored the first rushing touchdown of his career on a 55-yard tote, the longest score of the year on the ground for the Buccaneers.

References

External links
Tampa Bay Buccaneers bio
Vanderbilt Commodores bio

1997 births
Living people
Players of American football from Nashville, Tennessee
American football running backs
Illinois Fighting Illini football players
Vanderbilt Commodores football players
Tampa Bay Buccaneers players